Slowdive are a British rock band that formed in Reading, Berkshire, in 1989. The band consists of Rachel Goswell on vocals and guitar, Neil Halstead on vocals and guitar, Christian Savill on guitar, Nick Chaplin on bass and Simon Scott on drums, all of whom have played on the band's debut Just for a Day in 1991. Halstead is the band's primary songwriter.

Goswell and Halstead had known each other since early childhood. The band is one of the most prominent within the shoegaze scene, which rose to prominence in England during the early 1990s. While the band's second album Souvlaki initially received mixed reviews upon release, it has since been recognized as one of the best releases of the 1990s and one of the greatest shoegaze albums of all time. 

The band broke up soon after the release of their third album Pygmalion in 1995, having seen Scott, Savill and Chaplin all depart the band prior. The remaining members continued under a more folk and country-influenced direction as Mojave 3. Slowdive reunited in 2014 to play the Primavera Sound festival, and released a self-titled album in 2017, their first in 22 years.

History

1989–1991: Formation and early EPs
Slowdive was formed in Reading, England, by Neil Halstead and Rachel Goswell in October 1989. The two sang and played guitar, and had been friends since they were 6 years old. At a Sunday youth group, they began making music in an indie pop band called the Pumpkin Fairies, with bassist Mike Cottle and drummer Adrian Sell. When the Pumpkin Fairies disbanded, Slowdive formed, also including drummer Adrian Sell and Sell's friend, bassist Nick Chaplin. A third guitarist named Christian Savill, previously of the band Eternal, joined when he became the only person to answer an advert from the band. The ad called for a female guitarist, but Savill wanted to join so badly he offered to wear a dress. He was subsequently recruited. The name "Slowdive" was inspired by a dream Chaplin experienced, and was chosen against the wishes of Goswell, who was outvoted after protesting the fact that it shared the same name as the single "Slowdive", from one of her favourite bands, Siouxsie and the Banshees. 

The band quickly recorded a demo and several months later played a show with the band Five Thirty. Steve Walters, head of A&R at EMI, had attended the show. Afterward, he approached Savill and requested one of their demos. Slowdive signed to Creation Records shortly after. The average age of the band was 19 at the time. Sell felt things were progressing too fast and left for university after being in the band for about six months.

A self-titled EP was released in November 1990 and received praise from music critics. Slowdive was actually their original demo; the band had preferred the older recordings after feeling disillusioned with their studio craft. In a glowing recommendation, NME staff member Simon Williams wrote "Slowdive have banished the barrier restricting creativity... When they really relax, Slowdive can make Cocteau Twins sound like Mudhoney". Melody Maker awarded the EP its "Single of the Week" award, an accolade the band's next two EPs received.

Drummer Neil Carter joined from fellow Reading band the Colour Mary in time to play on the Morningrise EP, but left prior to its release in February 1991. Simon Scott took over on drums after his previous group, an alternative rock band called the Charlottes, broke up. The Holding Our Breath EP followed in June 1991, reaching No. 52 in the UK Albums Chart, while the single "Catch the Breeze" topped the UK Indie Chart.

1991–1992: Just for a Day
By mid-1991, Slowdive had been tagged a "shoegazing" band and part of "the scene that celebrates itself" by the British media. The term shoegazer was applied to bands that followed My Bloody Valentine's example of abrasive guitars and ethereal vocals, while "the scene" represented these like-minded groups and their social behaviour; shoegazers typically mingled at each other's gigs. Slowdive toured with other shoegazing bands through summer 1991. The British music press became increasingly derisive of shoegazing as the Britpop and grunge movements came underway.

Production on Slowdive's debut commenced shortly after Halstead convinced Alan McGee, head of Creation Records, that the band had enough songs written for a full-length album, which was not actually true. The group hurriedly started writing songs in the studio. Experimentation with sounds and cannabis occurred during the process. Halstead drew lyrical inspiration from the abstract nature of the music. He recounted, "[We] went into a studio for six weeks and had no songs at the start and at the end we had an album".

Their debut, Just for a Day was released in September 1991 and placed in the top 10 on the UK Indie Chart. NME gave the record a positive review, but most of the press generally disliked the album as a backlash against shoegazing began. As writer Peter Buckley put it, the album was "dismissed as dreary and lacking in ideas". Melody Maker writer Paul Lester railed against the debut, calling it a "major fucking letdown". This backlash worsened when critics reevaluated shoegazing after the release of My Bloody Valentine's Loveless in November 1991.

A tour of the United Kingdom followed in autumn 1991. Afterward, the group made their first visit to the United States and toured with alternative rock band Blur. A tour of Europe followed in February 1992. Slowdive's US label SBK Records planned to release Just for a Day at the beginning of the year, but not before initiating a viral marketing campaign. The band's name was stenciled outside MTV and radio stations in New York. Fans stencilled their heads when Slowdive played in Manhattan. The campaign caused some controversy when a statue celebrating the end of slavery was unveiled and had the word "Slowdive" stencilled on it. SBK eventually pushed the release date back three months, which hurt the viral campaign.

1992–1994: Souvlaki

While they toured in early 1992 to support Blue Day, a re-release of their early EP material, the band began writing songs for a follow-up album, but the negative coverage Slowdive received in the press affected their songwriting. "[It] did affect us as we were all teenagers at the time", said Scott in a 2009 interview, "[We] couldn't understand why people were so outraged by our sound that they had to tell the NME or whoever that they wanted us dead!" Approximately 40 songs were recorded and rerecorded as the group became very self-conscious of their writing and how it might be received. When McGee listened to the new material, he subsequently dismissed it, stating, "They're all shit". The band discarded all the music and started over. In a 2009 interview, Halstead vividly recalled the incident: "I remember going to start the record in a studio in Bath. Spiritualized had just been there and left a huge Scalextrix in the live room. I remember thinking this was the height of indulgence! Ironically we scrapped everything we recorded...we had to start the record again back in Oxfordshire. We should have just played with the Scalextrix for a month".

When the band returned to the UK, they wrote a letter to ambient visionary Brian Eno and requested he produce their second album. Eno responded and told them he liked their music, but wanted to collaborate, not produce. Halstead later called the recording session "one of the most surreal stoned experiences of [his] life". "The first thing he did when he walked into the studio was to rip the clock off the wall and put it by the mixing desk", Halstead remembered. "He then said 'Okay, you're going to play the guitar and I'm going to record it. I don't care what you are going to play, just play something.'" Two songs from the collaboration appeared on the ensuing album: "Sing", which was co-written with Eno, and "Here She Comes", where Eno played keyboards.

Creation Records wanted Slowdive to produce a commercial sounding album. Halstead agreed: "We wanted to make a 'pop' record but it took a while to record". At one point, Halstead suddenly left in summer 1992, seeking seclusion in a Welsh cottage. Savill, Chaplin and Scott were left in a recording studio in Weston-super-Mare, and while waiting for Halstead's return, recorded some "joke songs". To their misfortune, McGee acquired them and became despondent, by which time Halstead had arrived with new music, including "Dagger" and "40 Days." The band named their second album Souvlaki after a skit performed by the Jerky Boys, an American comedy duo that recorded prank phone calls.

Souvlaki was released in May 1993 alongside the  Outside Your Room EP, a few months after Suede released their popular debut and the Britpop movement began. Critical reaction, as with their previous album, was generally negative. NME writer John Mulvey gave an ambivalent review. Despite noting their dated and "unfulfilling" sound, he did call it an "exemplary product". Dave Simpson, writing for Melody Maker, declared, "[This] record is a soulless void [...] I would rather drown choking in a bath full of porridge than ever listen to it again". To make matters worse, Slowdive booked a tour with fellow shoegazers Catherine Wheel for a tour of the United States, only to find SBK had pushed the album's US release date back eight months. The band recorded an EP, titled 5 EP, and started a modest tour through Europe with dream pop band Cranes. Scott was unhappy with the gap between releases and quit the band in 1994.

A marketing campaign was started in early 1994 to promote Souvlaki in the United States, which AllMusic writer Andy Kellman said would "undoubtedly go down in industry history as one of the laziest ever"; SBK sent fans a release flyer and were told that if they copied and posted 50 flyers around town, they would receive a free copy of Souvlaki. Fans who participated had to document their progress with photographs to prove they actually performed the activity. Halfway through the Souvlaki US tour, SBK pulled their funding and left Slowdive to pay the rest themselves. In 1994, the band funded two small tours of the United States using money raised through the sale of a live tape and a tour programme that mocked the record label.

1994–1995: Pygmalion
Scott was replaced on drums by Ian McCutcheon. By the recording of their final album, Pygmalion, Halstead had moved Slowdive away from the dreamy guitar sound and warm yet solemn tone of earlier releases to a newer, more minimalist extreme, similar to heavily ambient bands such as Seefeel, A.R. Kane and Labradford.

Slowdive were dropped by Creation a week after the release of Pygmalion (as were Swervedriver not long after).

1995–2014: Post-Slowdive endeavours
Shortly after being dropped by Creation, Halstead, Goswell and McCutcheon recorded an album of country-influenced songs, and were signed to label 4AD, changing the band name to Mojave 3 to reflect the new musical direction. This group is currently on hiatus.

Drummer Scott went on to form Televise, taking the ambient shoegazing sound and pushing it into electronic fields similar to Fennesz. He joined Lowgold in 1999. Scott later went on to release solo records on the 12k, Miasmah, Sonic Pieces and Kompakt labels, and co-write and perform with Ghostly International-signed Seattle band the Sight Below.

Savill went on to form Monster Movie, a dream pop group that maintained much of the older Slowdive style. They have released four albums and an EP to date. Pre-Slowdive, Savill was in a band called Eternal, which also included Monster Movie member Sean Hewson.

Halstead and Goswell have both released solo albums on 4AD, and Halstead formed the side project Black Hearted Brother in 2013. Goswell joined the supergroup Minor Victories in 2015.

Halstead also recorded with a side project called Zurich with members of Seefeel and Knives ov Resistance; the trio's sole album was released in 2009.

2014–present: Reunion and future plans

After a Slowdive Twitter account and website were launched in January 2014, it was announced that Slowdive had re-formed to play the 2014 Primavera Sound Festival in Barcelona and Porto. A 20-date summer world tour was announced, including performances at the Electric Picnic Festival in Stradbally, County Laois; the FYF Fest in Los Angeles; the Fortress Festival in Fort Worth, Texas; the Wave-Gotik-Treffen festival in Leipzig; the Roskilde Festival in Denmark; the Radar Festival in Italy and the Off Festival in Katowice, Poland. A North American tour, also 20 dates, was announced for October and November 2014.

In January 2017, Slowdive released "Star Roving", their first single in 22 years, on Dead Oceans. Their fourth, self-titled album, was released in May 2017, preceded by another single, "Sugar for the Pill".

As of September 2020, Slowdive are working on their fifth studio album. Details about a title, release date or tracklist are yet to be revealed.

Influences and style
Music writer Simon Reynolds wrote that "Halstead was more influenced by Pink Floyd than by the Sex Pistols. Slowdive's formative pop experiences involve post-punk groups like the Cure and Siouxsie and the Banshees, whose artsy approach was closer to '70s progressive groups than punk's angry minimalism". Halstead stated that Slowdive wanted "to create something big and beautiful and sort of timeless". Other names he mentioned were David Bowie, the Byrds,  the Rolling Stones, Cocteau Twins, My Bloody Valentine and the Jesus and Mary Chain's album Psychocandy.

Their sound has been described as dream pop, shoegaze, indie rock and ambient.

Personnel
 Members
 Neil Halstead — vocals, guitar, keyboards (1989–1995, 2014–present)
 Rachel Goswell — vocals, guitar, keyboards, tambourine (1989–1995, 2014–present)
 Nick Chaplin — bass (1989–1995, 2014–present)
 Christian Savill — guitar (1989–1995, 2014–present)
 Simon Scott — drums (1991–1994, 2014–present); guitar, electronics (2014–present)

 Former members
 Adrian Sell — drums (1989–1990)
 Nick Carter — drums (1990–1991)
 Ian McCutcheon — drums (1994–1995)

Discography

Just for a Day (1991)
Souvlaki (1993)
Pygmalion (1995)
Slowdive (2017)

References

Notes

Bibliography

External links

 
 Slowdive Discography
 Slowdive Database Gigography

Creation Records artists
English rock music groups
British shoegaze musical groups
Dream pop musical groups
Musical groups from Reading, Berkshire
Musical groups established in 1989
Musical groups disestablished in 1995
Musical groups reestablished in 2014
SBK Records artists
English indie rock groups
Musicians from Berkshire
Dead Oceans artists
1989 establishments in England